Dealin' with Idiots is a 2013 American film written and directed by Jeff Garlin, who also stars. It was distributed by IFC Films and released on July 12, 2013.

Synopsis
According to a press release from IFC Films, the film's distributor, Dealin' with Idiots is about Max Morris, a famous comedian, who decides to get to know the colorful parents and coaches of his son's Little League Baseball team in an attempt to find the inspiration for his next movie.

Cast

Production
Dealin' with Idiots was written and directed by Garlin, inspired by his experiences with his son's youth baseball team.

References

External links
 
 

2013 films
American comedy films
2010s English-language films
Films directed by Jeff Garlin
Films produced by Christine Vachon
Killer Films films
2010s American films